Rain were an alternative rock band from Liverpool, England, who had a minor hit in 1997 with "Lemonstone Desired".

History
The band was formed at the Merseyside Trade Union Community and Unemployed Resource Centre in Huyton, Liverpool, in 1988 with a line-up of Ned Murphy (vocals, guitar), Colin Clarke (vocals, guitar), Martyn Campbell (bass guitar, vocals), and Tony McGuigan (drums). They were signed by Columbia Records in late 1989, and began recording with Nick Lowe producing. Unhappy with the results, they did not release any material until their 1991 debut single "Lemonstone Desired", which reached number 95 on the UK Singles Chart, and was the source of some controversy due to the photograph of a naked woman on the sleeve. The band recorded a session for Mark Goodier's BBC Radio 1 show in March that year. This was followed by debut album A Taste of Rain, drawing comparisons with Cream, R.E.M., and the Byrds, and a single featuring the title track from the album. The album was followed by a reissued "Lemonstone Desired", which proved to be the band's final release while together, although they shared a posthumous split album with the Real People in 1996, featuring tracks mainly taken from their album.

Discography

Albums
A Taste of Rain (1991), Columbia
Liverpool: Calm Before the Storm (1996), Columbia - split with the Real People
Ten Belters and a Slow One (2016)

Singles
"Lemonstone Desired" (1991), Columbia - UK #95
"A Taste of Rain" (1991), Columbia
"Lemonstone Desired" (1991), Columbia - reissue

References

English alternative rock groups
Musical groups from Liverpool
Musical groups established in 1988
Musical groups disestablished in 1992
Columbia Records artists